The northern freetail bat (Chaerephon jobensis) is a species of bat found in Yapen, Seram Island, Western New Guinea and Northern Australia.

Taxonomy and etymology
It was described as a new species in 1902 by American zoologist Gerrit Smith Miller Jr.
Miller placed it in the now-defunct genus Nyctinomus, naming it Nyctinomus jobensis.
Miller likely chose the species name "jobensis" because the holotype was discovered on Jobie Island near the community of Ansus.
The holotype was collected by Italian naturalist Odoardo Beccari.

Description
It has been described as having "features reminiscent of Darth Vader."
It weighs .

Biology and behavior
They will fly and forage in groups of two or more individuals.
Its foraging style utilizes fast, direct flight suited for open areas or above canopies.
It is insectivorous, consuming beetles, bugs, moths, lacewings, grasshoppers, cockroaches, flies and leafhoppers.
It is one of the only species of bat in Australia that can be heard when foraging.
Its typical echolocation frequency is relatively low (16-25kHz), overlapping with the upper range of sounds audible to humans. Lower frequency sounds down to below 10kHz have been recorded, with speculation that these are more likely to relate to social calls.
It is nocturnal, roosting in sheltered places during the day such as tree hollows or caves.
These roosts can consist of many individuals, as it is a colonial species.

Range and habitat
It prefers to forage in the tropical savannas of Northern Australia.
It is also found in urban areas, using artificial lights to forage for the insects attracted to them.

Conservation
It is currently evaluated as least concern by the IUCN—its lowest conservation priority.
It meets the criteria for this assessment because it has a large geographic range, a large population, it occurs in protected areas, and it tolerates human modification of landscapes.
Its population trend is stable.

References

Molossidae
Bats of Asia
Bats of Oceania
Bats of Australia
Bats of Indonesia
Bats of New Guinea
Mammals of Papua New Guinea
Mammals of Western New Guinea
Mammals of Queensland
Mammals of Western Australia
Yapen Islands
Mammals described in 1902
Taxa named by Gerrit Smith Miller Jr.